The Best of Della Reese is a "best of" album released by Jubilee Records in 1962. The album includes tracks from Della Reese's Jubilee years, recorded between 1954 and 1959.

Track listing

Side A
"Stormy Weather" (3:37)
"Pennies from Heaven[Live]" (1:51)
"I'm Nobody's Baby" (3:11)
"Happiness Is a Thing Called Joe [Live]" (4:12)
"What Do You Know About Love?" (3:09)
"I've Got My Love to Keep Me Warm" (2:20)

Side B
"All Alone" (2:58)
"All of Me [Live]" (1:58)
"Nobody Knows the Trouble I've Seen" (4:41)
"In the Still of the Night" (3:03)
"My Melancholy Baby" (3:33)
"The Party's Over [Live]" (2:48)

References
 Jubilee at Soulful Kinda Music.

Della Reese albums
1962 greatest hits albums
Jubilee Records compilation albums